Tyler Brock Pastornicky (born December 13, 1989) is an American former professional baseball shortstop. He was drafted by the Toronto Blue Jays in 2008 Major League Baseball draft and made his Major League Baseball debut with the Atlanta Braves in 2012.

Professional career

Toronto Blue Jays
Pastornicky was drafted by the Toronto Blue Jays in the fifth round of the 2008 MLB draft out of The Pendleton School. Pastornicky played 2008 with the Gulf Coast League Blue Jays, hitting .263 in 50 games with 27 stolen bases in 32 attempts. He played 2009 mostly with Single-A Lansing, hitting .269 in 109 games with 51 stolen bases in 66 attempts. He played 15 games with High-A Dunedin. Pastornicky started 2010 with Dunedin, hitting .258 with 24 stolen bases in 31 attempts. He was named to the Florida State League All-Star Game.

Atlanta Braves
On July 15, 2010, the Blue Jays traded Pastornicky along with Álex González and Tim Collins to the Atlanta Braves for Yunel Escobar and Jo-Jo Reyes. He finished 2010 with Double-A Mississippi. In total, he hit .257 in 115 games with 35 stolen bases in 44 attempts. Pastornicky played for Phoenix where he went 15-54 in 15 games. Pastornicky played 2011 mostly with Mississippi, but also played 27 games for Triple-A Gwinnett. With Mississippi, he hit .299 in 90 games and stole 20 of 28. He was named to the Southern League All-Star Game.

Pastornicky was called up to the majors for the first time on September 28, 2011.

Pastornicky made his major league debut on April 5, 2012, as the Opening Day shortstop for the Braves against the New York Mets in New York City. Pastornicky recorded his first hit that day, a triple off of Ramón Ramírez that went over the head of center fielder Andrés Torres. His first home run came on April 10, 2012 against the Houston Astros at Minute Maid Park. He was sent back down to Triple-A Gwinnett after having the lowest fielding percentage among all major league shortstops. He was replaced by Andrelton Simmons who was called up from Double-A Mississippi on June 2, 2012. Pastornicky was designated for assignment on January 8, 2015, and released on March 19.

Texas Rangers / Philadelphia Phillies
On March 22, 2015, Pastornicky signed a minor league contract with the Texas Rangers. He was assigned to AA Frisco RoughRiders. He was then promoted from AA to AAA Round Rock Express. The Rangers traded Pastornicky to the Philadelphia Phillies for cash considerations on August 10. He elected free agency in November 2015.

International competition
Pastornicky represented the United States at the 2015 Pan American Games, and earned a silver medal as a member of the baseball team. In October, Pastornicky was placed on the roster for the inaugural 2015 WBSC Premier12. The United States finished the tournament with a silver medal.

Personal life
He is the son of former Kansas City Royals third baseman Cliff Pastornicky and the grandson of Ernest Pastornicky, who played in the Chicago Cubs minor league system.

See also
List of second-generation Major League Baseball players

References

External links

1989 births
Living people
Atlanta Braves players
Baseball players at the 2015 Pan American Games
Baseball players from Florida
Dunedin Blue Jays players
Frisco RoughRiders players
Gulf Coast Blue Jays players
Gwinnett Braves players
Lansing Lugnuts players
Lehigh Valley IronPigs players
Major League Baseball shortstops
Mississippi Braves players
Pan American Games medalists in baseball
Pan American Games silver medalists for the United States
Phoenix Desert Dogs players
Round Rock Express players
Sportspeople from Bradenton, Florida
Toros del Este players
American expatriate baseball players in the Dominican Republic
United States national baseball team players
Medalists at the 2015 Pan American Games
IMG Academy alumni